Goldbug Hot Springs is a hot spring located in the Salmon-Challis National Forest about 20 miles south of Salmon, Idaho. The spring is along Warm Spring Creek and there are about six waterfall-fed pools. The pools have a sand/gravel bottom and are dammed by boulders. Due to the hike and remoteness of the trailhead, it is not usually crowded.

Water from Goldbug Hot Springs flows into Warm Springs Creek, which flows into the Salmon River.

Recreation
The trailhead for Goldbug Hot Springs can be accessed from a well maintained dirt road off US 93 near mile marker 282.  The first  of the trail is on private land that is part of a Bureau of Land Management easement. Hikers will experience  in elevation gain along the  hike. The trail is maintained with sturdy bridges, and there are sections where hikers will be climbing steps. The last  of the hike is the steepest, and the trail continues beyond the hot spring itself.

Camping is prohibited at the trailhead, on the easement and within  of the hot spring itself. Along the trail, however, there are numerous primitive campgrounds. There is also a campground above the highest pool along Warm Spring Creek. Overnight campers will enjoy almost zero light pollution.

The hot spring is free and open year-round. It is not unusual to find visitors skinny dipping.

Weather
While the hot spring is open year-round, heavy snow in the winter may cause difficulties in accessing it. Temperatures in the pools will be rather chilly in the winter. Summertime temperatures can get extremely hot, and it is suggested that hikers bring extra water and sunblock with them.

Flora and Fauna
Plants and animals near Goldbug Hot Spring are what you would expect to see in the high desert. There are intermittent douglas fir and lodgepole pine trees along the riparian zone and in the higher elevations of the trail. Otherwise, sagebrush and native grasses are abundant mixed in with the rocky terrain.

It is not unusual to see snakes in the area, including venomous rattlesnakes. Big game, such as Mule deer can be seen occasionally, along with rare black bears. Jackrabbits, badgers and other small game are fairly common.

References

Lemhi County, Idaho
Tourist attractions in Lemhi County, Idaho
Salmon-Challis National Forest
Hot springs of Idaho